The Guildford Flames are a  professional ice hockey team based in Guildford, Surrey and they play their home games in the Guildford Spectrum. They compete in the top-tier of hockey in the United Kingdom, the Elite Ice Hockey League.

Founded in October 1992, the Flames originally played in the second-tier leagues of British hockey, first the British National League until 2004, and subsequently the English Premier Ice Hockey League until 2017. On 24 February 2017 it was announced that the Flames would become the 12th Elite Ice Hockey League team, joining from the 2017–18 season.

The team's head coach is Paul Dixon, who took over after Stan Marple retired in 2007.

Formation
Barry Dow, an American who sponsored and owned the basketball team Guildford Kings and Bill Hurley established and owned the team as management – the two were new to the sport of ice hockey, and brought in Mike Urquhart as coach and Darrin Zinger as captain.

Key players signed for the first season included Canadians Sean Murphy and Dave McGahan due to their high scoring at Solent Vikings. In addition a number of British players including goaltender, Mike Kellond; forward, Danny O'Hanlon and defender, Gary Shearer.

The Flames' inaugural season began in October 1992; they began, unseeded, in the English League Division One.  With the Guildford Spectrum not yet completed, the team had to train at Slough's facility. The Flames played their home games at Alexandra Palace until their new home ice was ready and played there for the first time on 23 January 1993.

When 23 January 1993 finally arrived and the Guildford Spectrum opened, the event was a big one. The area's paid-for newspaper The Surrey Advertiser described the local council's £28 million arena as "awesome". Guildford's first game at their new home showed a convincing win with Andy Sparks scoring the first goal at the Spectrum.  The team went to the top of the Conference due to that game, a position they held onto for the whole season.

Elite League

The Guildford Flames were confirmed as an Elite League expansion team in February 2017, stepping up from the English Premier Ice Hockey League (EPIHL), and began play in the UK's top division at the start of the 2017–18 EIHL season.

The Flames finished in sixth in their first season (2017–18), followed by a fifth-placed finish in 2018–19 - a campaign in which they finished runners-up to the Belfast Giants in the Challenge Cup final.

Guildford were again in sixth when the 2019–20 EIHL season's remaining matches were cancelled in March 2020 due to the coronavirus pandemic. The play-offs were cancelled with only the Challenge Cup seeing a winner (the Sheffield Steelers) crowned.

Then, the 2020–21 Elite League season - originally scheduled for a revised start date of 5 December - was suspended on 15 September 2020 because of ongoing coronavirus pandemic restrictions. The EIHL board determined that the season was non-viable without supporters being permitted to attend matches and unanimously agreed to a suspension. The season was cancelled completely in February 2021.

In the 2021–22 EIHL season, Guildford finished the regular season in fifth place with a 25-25-4 record, reaching the quarter-finals of the Challenge Cup (losing 6–5 on aggregate to Nottingham Panthers) and the play-off semi-finals (beating Nottingham 7–6 on aggregate in the quarter-finals, before losing in the last four to Cardiff Devils 3–2). Guildford claimed third place by beating Dundee Stars 7–5 in the third/fourth place play-off.

Club honours
Season 2021/22
2021–22 EIHL All-Stars First Team: Jamal Watson
Season 2018/19
Patton Conference Champions
Challenge Cup runners-up
2018–19 EIHL All-Stars Second Team: Calle Ackered, Jesse Craige
Season 2017/18
2017–18 EIHL All-Stars First Team: Jesse Craige
2017–18 EIHL All-Stars Second Team: Calle Ackered, John Dunbar
Season 2015/16

English Premier Cup
English Premier League Playoff Winners
Season 2012/13
English Premier League Champions
English Premier Cup
Season 2011/12
English Premier League Champions
English Premier Cup
Season 2010/11

English Premier League Playoff Winners
Season 2009/10
English Premier Cup
Season 2007/08
English Premier League Champions
Season 2006/07
English Premier Cup
Season 2005/06
English Premier League Champions
Season 2003/04
 British National League Play-off Winners
Season 2000/01
 Christmas Cup Winners
 British National League Champions
 British National League Play-off Winners
Season 1998/99
 Benson & Hedges Plate Winners
Season 1997/98
 British National League Southern Conference Winners
 British National League Winners
 British National League Play-off Winners
Season 1996/97
 Benson & Hedges Plate Winners

Team logo and jersey

The team logo is very similar to that of the Calgary Flames of the NHL.  The team jerseys mirror those used by a former NHL team, Atlanta Thrashers from 1999 to 2006 (with logos replaced and advertisements added).

Current squad 
Squad for 2022-23 Elite League season

* Denotes two-way deal with Basingstoke Bison of the NIHL
** Denotes two-way deal with Bristol Pitbulls of the NIHL

Retired numbers
The retired numbers at the Guildford Flames are:
 3 Stan Marple
10 Ryan Campbell
11 Fred Perlini
9 Terry Kurtenbach
15 Andy Sparks

Team captains
1992–94 – Darren Zinger
1994–99 – Paul Thompson
1999-00 – Karry Biette
2000–01 – Wayne Crawford
2001–07 – Paul Dixon
2007–09 – Ricky Plant
2009–10 – Rob Lamey
2010–15 – David Longstaff
2015–17 – Jeremy Lundin
2017–20 – Jesse Craige
2021– Brett Ferguson

References

External links
Official Guildford Flames website

 
Ice hockey teams in England
Sport in Guildford
Ice hockey clubs established in 1992
EPIHL teams
1992 establishments in England